The 26th Golden Bell Awards was held on 26 April 1991 and 27 April 1991 at the Sun Yat-sen Memorial Hall in Taipei, Taiwan. The ceremony was broadcast by China Television (CTV).

Winners

References

1991
1991 in Taiwan